The former city of Dehistan/Mashhad-i Misrian, now in the Balkan Region of western Turkmenistan, was a major economic center from the 10th to the 14th centuries CE. The city lay on an important trade route of the states comprising Greater Iran.

Sites

Misrian
A double-walled city punctuated with guard-towers, Misrian was abandoned c. 15th century. Only a few monuments survive:
 Mosque of Khorezmshah Mohammed: Nothing stands except the two side columns of the main portal —18 m. in height, decorated with brickwork and turquoise glaze to render floral and geometric patterns— and a minaret at the corner of courtyard. The foundation of the mosque, comprising numerous fired-brick columns, have been excavated and restored. In the center of the courtyard, Niyazov had installed 3 evergreen trees within a fence in 1993.
Abu-Jafar Ahmed Minaret: About 120 m. away from the courtyard minaret, this was designed by one Abu Bini Ziyad c. early 11th century. It features two rings of Arab inscriptions, and a higher ring of geometric motifs. A spiral staircase can be used to access the top.
 Caravansarays: Excavations have discovered bases of multiple caravansarays.

Mashat 
A medieval graveyard, the site houses five mausoleums along a single line; in nineteenth century, there were apparently about twenty. All are either circular or octagonal, and lack in domes. Adjacent to this line, is located the Shir-kabir Mosque-Maousoleum atop a mound. Dated to 9th/10th century, this is the oldest extant mosque in Turkmenistan

World Heritage Status
This site was added to the UNESCO World Heritage Tentative List on February 25, 1998, in the Cultural category.

External Links 

Mosque of Khorezmshah Mohammed:
Image of the minaret.
Image of an entrance portal, mostly ruined and isolated from the perimeter.
Image of a ruined arch — one half stands tall amidst a pile of bricks.
Abu-Jafar Ahmed Minaret:
Image snapped from some distance. Mosque of Khorezmshah Mohammed is visible in the background.
Shir-kabir Mosque-Maousoleum:
Image.

References

Asian archaeology
Turkmenistan culture
World Heritage Tentative List
Archaeological sites in Turkmenistan